Fort Lee may refer to:

 Fort Lee, New Jersey, a Borough in Bergen County, New Jersey, United States
 Koreatown, Fort Lee, an ethnic Korean enclave in the above borough
 Battle of Fort Lee, fought on November 20, 1776, between American and British forces
 Fort Lee (Salem, Massachusetts), a historic site that was an American Revolution fort
 Fort Lee (Virginia), a census-designated place and a United States Army post in Prince George County, Virginia, United States
 SS Fort Lee, a World War II tanker ship